The Surya River is a river in located in the Palghar district of Maharashtra.

It has a bridge on the Golden Quadrilateral highway near Charoti in the Palghar district.

References

Rivers of Maharashtra
Rivers of India